Jordi Font (born 1 May 1975 in Barcelona) is a Spanish snowboarder. He placed fourth in the men's snowboard cross event at the 2006 Winter Olympics; he also competed in the same event at the 2010 Winter Olympics but did not finish the qualification round.

References

1975 births
Living people
Sportspeople from Barcelona
Spanish male snowboarders
Olympic snowboarders of Spain
Snowboarders at the 2006 Winter Olympics
Snowboarders at the 2010 Winter Olympics
21st-century Spanish people